

Christian-Johannes Landau (13 October 1897 – 10 December 1952) was a German general  in the Wehrmacht during World War II who commanded the 176th Infantry Division.

Awards and decorations

 German Cross in Gold on 2 May 1944 as Oberst in Artillerie-Regiment 248
 Nominated for Knight's Cross of the Iron Cross. The nomination by the troop was received by the Heerespersonalamt (HPA—Army Staff Office) on 28 April 1945. Major Joachim Domaschk the nomination on 6 May 1945. The book "Verliehene Ritterkreuze" (Awarded Knight Crosses) contains a note "postponed". The reason for this was that his division together with Heeresgruppe B had been annihilated in the Ruhr Pocket, the whereabouts of its commanding officer was unknown. The nomination was therefore not processed in accordance with AHA 44 Ziff. 572 (Allgemeines Heeresamt — General Army Office). A presentation was never made. The presentation date was assigned by Walther-Peer Fellgiebel.

References

Citations

Bibliography

 

1897 births
1952 deaths
People from Altona, Hamburg
Major generals of the German Army (Wehrmacht)
German Army personnel of World War I
Prussian Army personnel
Recipients of the clasp to the Iron Cross, 1st class
Recipients of the Gold German Cross
Recipients of the Knight's Cross of the Iron Cross
German prisoners of war in World War II
Military personnel from Hamburg
German Army generals of World War II